Cassipourea flanaganii is a species of plant in the Rhizophoraceae family. It is endemic to South Africa.  It is threatened by habitat loss.

References

flanaganii
Endemic flora of South Africa
Vulnerable plants
Taxonomy articles created by Polbot